United States men's national softball team is the national team for the United States.  The 1988 World Championships were held in Saskatoon, Canada.  The team played 13 games in the round robin round. The  United States beat Australia 21–1 in one game in this round. The team competed at the 1992 ISF Men's World Championship in Manila, Philippines where they finished with 10 wins and 3 losses.  The team competed at the 1996 ISF Men's World Championship in Midland, Michigan where they finished with 10 wins and 4 losses.  The team competed at the 2000 ISF Men's World Championship in East London, South Africa where they finished third. The team competed at the 2004 ISF Men's World Championship in Christchurch, New Zealand where they finished third.  The team competed at the 2009 ISF Men's World Championship in Saskatoon, Saskatchewan where they finished fourth.

References

Men's national softball teams
softball
Softball in the United States